{{DISPLAYTITLE:C27H30O17}}
The molecular formula C27H30O17 (molar mass: 626 g/mol, exact mass: 626.1482994 u) may refer to:
 Myricetin 3-O-rutinoside, a flavonol glycoside
 Quercetin 3,4'-diglucoside, a flavonol glycoside

Molecular formulas